Glacial Ridge National Wildlife Refuge was created on October 12, 2004, the 545th National Wildlife Refuge in the United States. Its creation was the result of cooperation between at least 30 agencies or governmental entities.

Location
The Glacial Ridge NWR is located six miles (10 km) west of Mentor, Minnesota, or about twelve miles (19 km) east of Crookston, Minnesota.

Description
Of this planned area  previously existed in an unplowed state, and a further  has been seeded with native prairie grasses. In addition, more than 100 wetlands have been restored. The restoration of native tallgrass prairie is ongoing, and will require years of effort.

Purpose
The following five items are the main objectives of the refuge:

Strive to maintain diversity and increase abundance of waterfowl and other migratory bird species dependent of prairie wetland and grassland habitats
Conserve, manage, and restore the diversity and viability of native fish, wildlife and plant populations associated with tallgrass prairie and prairie wetlands
Work in partnership with others to restore or enhance native tallgrass prairie, prairie wetlands and unique plant communities
Restore, enhance, and protect water quality and quantity that approach natural hydrologic functions
Provide for compatible wildlife-dependent recreational uses by the public, emphasizing increased understanding of the northern tallgrass prairie ecosystem and the mission of the National Wildlife Refuge System

Wildlife
This prairie wetland complex hosts a great diversity of plant species.  Of special interest is the federally threatened western prairie fringed orchid.  Other communities found at the preserve include wet and mesic tallgrass prairie and gravel prairie, willow thickets, mixed prairie, sedge meadow, aspen woodlands and emergent marsh. Prairie species at Pembina Trail Preserve include prairie Junegrass, purple prairie clover, big and little bluestem and mat muhly.

When restored, Glacial Ridge will likely provide habitat for several of the same species present at Pembina Trail Preserve, which harbors more than 73 bird species, 35 butterfly species, 11 mammal species, three amphibian species and one reptile species.  Birds like the sandhill crane, sharp-tailed grouse, upland sandpiper, northern harrier, marbled godwit, Wilson's phalarope, sora rail, marsh wren, and clay colored sparrow may soon find their habitat expanded at Glacial Ridge.  In recent years, bald eagles, a peregrine falcon and a whooping crane have also been spotted. In 2007, a nesting pair of burrowing owls and their two owlets were sighted on a restored prairie.
Whitetail deer, moose, and prairie grouse are present within the NWR.  It has also become a major nesting and breeding area for waterfowl.  The return of the greater prairie chicken is one of the goals of the refuge.  Hunting is permitted within the boundaries of the refuge.

References

External links
 Glacial Ridge National Wildlife Refuge

National Wildlife Refuges in Minnesota
Protected areas of Polk County, Minnesota
Prairies
Protected areas established in 2004
Landforms of Polk County, Minnesota
Wetlands of Minnesota
2004 establishments in Minnesota